Erich Pointner (born 19 August 1950) is an Austrian judoka. He competed at the 1972 Summer Olympics and the 1976 Summer Olympics.

References

1950 births
Living people
Austrian male judoka
Olympic judoka of Austria
Judoka at the 1972 Summer Olympics
Judoka at the 1976 Summer Olympics
20th-century Austrian people